The 2003 Tour de Hongrie was the 30th edition of the Tour de Hongrie cycle race and was held from 29 July to 3 August 2003. The race started in Veszprém and finished in Budapest. The race was won by Zoltán Remák.

General classification

References

2003
Tour de Hongrie
Tour de Hongrie